Giuseppe Gallignani (January 9, 1851, Faenza - December 14, 1923, Milan) was an Italian composer, conductor and music teacher.

He graduated from Milan Conservatory.

Author operas Il grillo del focolare (1873, one of the Christmas stories  Charles Dickens - the first in the history of opera in the Dickens story),  Atala (1876), Nestorius (1888) et al., as well as numerous spiritual music.

In 1884-1891  musical director of Milan Cathedral. In 1891, on the recommendation of Giuseppe Verdi and Arrigo Boito he was appointed director of the Conservatory of Parma and directed it until 1897. In 1894 he held a series of concerts to commemorate the 300th anniversary of the death of Giovanni Palestrina, which provoked a violent backlash.

In 1923, refusing to join the National Fascist Party, he was accused of embezzling public money and committed suicide.

References

External links
 
 Operone - Giuseppe Gallignani

1851 births
1923 suicides
People from Faenza
Italian composers
Italian male classical composers
Italian classical composers
Italian opera composers
Male opera composers
Italian classical musicians
Italian conductors (music)
Italian male conductors (music)
Italian music educators
Suicides in Italy